Quiet Song is an album by pianist Paul Bley, clarinetist Jimmy Giuffre and guitarist Bill Connors recorded in 1974 and released on Bley's own Improvising Artists label in 1975.

Reception

Allmusic awarded the album 2½ stars noting "Although there are some interesting instrumental colors, much of the music rambles and wanders without much purpose and the results are rather inconclusive and slightly disappointing considering the talent involved".
The Penguin Guide to Jazz said "Most of the pieces are improvised and most are thoughtful and introspective rather than dramatic".

Track listing
 "Solo" (Jimmy Giuffre) - 0:56	
 "Duet" (Bill Connors) - 4:35	
 "Play Blue" (Paul Bley) - 3:23	
 "Clarinet" (Jimmy Giuffre) - 0:52	
 "Yeah, Guitar" (Paul Bley) - 3:48	
 "Carol" (Paul Bley) -1:43	
 "Trio" (Paul Bley) -1:44		
 "Goodbye" (Gordon Jenkins) - 3:34	
 "Laurent" (Paul Bley) - 2:04	
 "Quiet Song" (Paul Bley) - 9:47

Personnel 
Paul Bley - piano
Jimmy Giuffre - clarinet, flute  
Bill Connors - guitar

References 

1975 albums
Paul Bley albums
Improvising Artists Records albums